Bakonytamási is a village in Veszprém county, Hungary.

In the 19th and 20th centuries, a small Jewish community lived in the village, in 1910 35 Jews lived in the village, most of whom were murdered in the Holocaust. The community had a Jewish cemetery.

References

External links 
 Street map (Hungarian)

Populated places in Veszprém County
Jewish communities destroyed in the Holocaust